The 1986 Arab Club Champions Cup was played in the African half of the Arab world for the first time, in Tunis, Tunisia.
Al-Rasheed won the championship for the 2nd time, defending their championship and becoming the first side to win the title outside of their homeland in the process.

Participants

Preliminary round

Zone 1 (Gulf Area)
Al-Arabi qualified to the final tournament.

Zone 2 (Red Sea)
Matches held in Riyadh

Al-Hilal qualified to the final tournament.

Zone 3 (North Africa)
Matches held in Tunis

ES Tunis qualified to the final tournament.

Zone 4 (East Region)
Matches held in Homs

Al-Jaish qualified to the final tournament.

Final tournament

Winner

External links
4th Arab Club Champions Cup 1986 - rsssf.com

Arab Champions League, 2006-07
Arab Champions League, 2007-08
1986
International club association football competitions hosted by Tunisia
Arab Club Champions